The 2015 NBB All-Star Game was an exhibition basketball game that was played on March 7, 2015, at Ginásio Pedrocão in Franca, São Paulo, home of Franca Basquetebol Clube. This game was the 7th edition of the NBB All-Star Game and was played during the 2014–15 NBB season. Frnaca was awarded for the third time to host the All-Star Game in an announcement by president Cássio Roque on February 6, 2015.

The teams were formed by Brazilian players, called NBB Brasil (NBB Brazil), and by foreign players, called NBB Mundo (NBB World). The twelve players of each team were selected by the trade press, the teams' captains and coaches. Starters for the game were selected by the fans, who could select one guard, two forwards and two centers for each team.

All-Star Game

Coaches
Demétrius Ferraciú, coach of Minas, and Paco García, coach of the Mogi das Cruzes, were selected as the NBB Brasil and NBB Mundo head coach, respectively. Guerrinha, from Bauru, was selected as the NBB Brasil assistant coach; while Dedé Barbosa, from Limeira, was selected as the NBB Mundo assistant coach.

Roster 

INJ Hettsheimeir, Jefferson and Caio Torres were unable to participate due to injuries.
REP1 Audrei was named as Jefferson's replacement.
REP2 Rafael Mineiro was named as Caio Torres' replacement.
REP3 Giovannoni was named as Hettsheimeir's replacement.
ST Lucas Mariano was chosen to start the game in place of the injured Hettsheimeir.

Game 

Ricardo Fischer set a game-high in points, with 26 points, and assists, with 13 assists. Those numbers granted him a number of 42 in efficiency and the NBB All-Star Game Most Valuable Player award.

All-Star Weekend

Shooting Stars Competition
In the 7th edition of NBB All-Star Game, it was the second time that the Shooting Stars Competition of Brazilian basketball was disputed. Four teams were formed, each of them containing one NBB's player, one retired male player and one female player. For the edition, LNB selected the players who were Liga de Basquete Feminino (LBF).

The mechanics of dispute Shooting Stars Competition. Each group of three players has to transform seven shots from different positions of the court, the last of them being half-court. The maximum time for each triplet closed the circuit for two minutes. The two fastest times qualified for the decision of the competition.

Skills Challenge 
The Skills Challenge, which was played for the fourth time, had the presence of three times champion Nezinho, from Limeira, the forward Léo Meindl, from the host team Franca, and seven more competitors which was determined by the LNB Technical Department.

Three-Point Tournament 
The tournament had six competitors for the title. The champion of previous season Marcelinho Machado, from Flamengo, and Marcos Mata, from the host city team, had already been secured in the dispute and its six rivals, with four of this five players being the four greatest three-point shooters. The veteran forward won his second title in a row after setting a number of 20 three-pointers in the first round and matching in the final his own and tournament history record of 23 three-pointers, so defeating the point guard Eric Tatu, from Rio Claro Basquete. He also became the most winner of the tournament, alongside the forward Fernando Fischer, who won his two titles while he was playing for Bauru.

Dunk Tournament 
For Dunk Tournament, the host team, Franca, was represented by the center André Coimbra. The other challengers to the title was defined after being evaluated by a jury of personalities from basketball. As a result of the partnership between Liga Nacional de Basquete and National Basketball Association, the greatest basketball league in the world, one of the jurors was the former forward/center Horace Grant, three times NBA champion with the Chicago Bulls and once NBA champion with the Los Angeles Lakers.

References

All